Hopea depressinerva is a tree in the family Dipterocarpaceae, native to Borneo. The specific epithet depressinerva means "sunken nerve", referring to the leaf veins.

Description
The bark may be cracked.

Distribution and habitat
Hopea depressinerva is endemic to Borneo, where it is confined to Sarawak.

Conservation
Hopea depressinerva has been assessed as critically endangered on the IUCN Red List. It is threatened by land conversion for palm oil plantations and by small-scale agriculture. The species is not present in any protected areas.

References

depressinerva
Endemic flora of Borneo
Flora of Sarawak
Plants described in 1967
Taxonomy articles created by Polbot